Jeannine Mukanirwa Tshimpambu (born 1965) is a Congolese women's rights activist. She has been recognised by Amnesty International for her work for women's rights and peace promotion.

Early life 
Jeannine Mukanirwa was born in 1965 in Kinshasa, Democratic Republic of the Congo. She has two children.

Activism 
Mukanirwa began women's rights activist work in 1989. In 2001 she was serving as vice president of  Promotion et Appui aux Initiatives Feminines (PAIF), a Congolese women's rights organisation. On 26 January she was arrested by Congolese authorities for suspected involvement in the assassination of President Laurent-Désiré Kabila. She was released the following month and subsequently moved to Canada to avoid political persecution, but continued to work for PAIF. In the early 2000s she condemned rape of women in the eastern Congo. In 2002, Amnesty International accorded her its Ginetta Sagan Award for her work for women's rights and peace promotion.

Mukanirwa oversaw the release of a pamphlet on violence against women in the Congo in 2007. In 2009 she became the coordinator of Medica Mondiale's Peacebuilding Project in the Congo. In 2018 she offered herself as a candidate to become President of the Democratic Republic of the Congo in the December elections.

References

Works cited 
 

1965 births
Living people
People from Kinshasa
Democratic Republic of the Congo women activists
20th-century women
21st-century women
Democratic Republic of the Congo expatriates in Canada
21st-century Democratic Republic of the Congo people